Albina Amangeldiyeva (born 1 November 1988) is a Kazakhstani judoka.

She is the bronze medallist of the 2017 Judo Grand Prix Antalya in the -78 kg category.

References

External links
 

1988 births
Living people
Judoka at the 2014 Asian Games
21st-century Kazakhstani women